Abutilon eremitopetalum, commonly known as the hidden-petaled abutilon or hiddenpetal Indian mallow, is a species of flowering shrub in the mallow family, Malvaceae. It is endemic to  dry forests and low shrublands on the windward side of the island of Lānai in Hawaii. It is classified by the IUCN Red List as critically endangered by habitat destruction. The species was first discovered in 1987.

References

External links

Abutilon eremitopetalum information from the Hawaiian Ecosystems at Risk project (HEAR)

eremitopetalum
Plants described in 1987
Endemic flora of Hawaii
Critically endangered flora of the United States
Taxonomy articles created by Polbot